Delhi 2 Dublin (sometimes abbreviated D2D) is a Canadian world music group formed in 2006 in Vancouver who play a fusion of Bhangra, electronic, funk, dub, reggae, hip hop, Celtic music and a mashup of other genres.

History
Delhi 2 Dublin was formed for a performance at the Vancouver Celtic Festival on 16 March 2006. The event was called 'Delhi to Dublin', which the group then took as their name. Founding members were Tarun Nayar (of Beats Without Borders cred), Sanjay Seran (at the time hailing from live bhangra act Signia), violinist Kytami, the late fiddle player Oliver Schroer and Adrian Blackhurst (also of Beats Without Borders). Their music was well received, and they began to play various venues, block parties, and festivals around Vancouver. Within their first few months, their lineup solidified to Tarun Nayar (tabla, electronics), Sanjay Seran (vocals), Kytami (violin), and new members Andrew Kim (sitar, guitar) and Ravi Binning (dhol). Their first big break was opening the Canada Day celebrations on Parliament Hill in Ottawa on 1 July 2007. The crowd was estimated at 150,000 and the show was broadcast live on national TV. At that point they had written only 3 songs.

Since 2008 their touring has grown from mostly Canadian dates to a growing US and international presence. Their first tour outside North America was in Taiwan in August 2009. They have since played in Dubai, Brunei, Indonesia (Bali Spirit Festival), Australia (Woodford Folk Festival), Germany (Popkomm), UK (Shambala, Solfest, Sunfest, Edinburgh Mela), Ireland, and Malaysia (MURfest); while continuing to play larger North American festivals such as Electric Forest (MI), Shambhala (BC), Calgary Folk Festival (AB) and the Santa Cruz Music Festival (CA). Their largest market is now California.

Their Delhi 2 Dublin debut album, released 13 December 2007, reached No. 3 on the Canadian world music charts, and was heard on the radio from Japan, across North America and Europe. In November 2008 they released their second album, Delhi 2 Dublin Remixed, consisting of remixes of songs from their first album, and reached No. 1 on the CHARTattack world music charts Their third album, Planet Electric, charted third on the Canadian world music charts. The band kept this pace, producing a new album bi-annually and a remix album alternating years.

In 2014 they released their first live album, recorded at the Commodore Ballroom in Vancouver, BC on their eighth birthday. That year also brought the addition of Serena Eades on violin (in lieu of fiddle player Sara Fitzpatrick) and James Hussain on guitar. Jaron Freeman-Fox continues being a featured guest at select shows, along with former member Andrew Kim.

We're All Desi, was released on 18 September 2015 on Westwood Recordings. Inspired by their favourite Bollywood records of the 1970s and their love of bass music, D2D teamed up with producer Nick Middleton (of The Funk Hunters) to create what they believe is their strongest offering yet.

The band's latest album is We Got This. The 2019 album focuses more on a pop sound and has more English lyrics.

Members 
Official
 Tarun Nayar – tabla, electronics
 Sanjay Seran – vocals
 Ravi Binning – dhol, dholak

Live performers
 Andrew Kim – electric sitar, guitar
 James Hussain – guitar
 Serena Eades – violin
 Jaron Freeman-Fox – violin, guitar

Former
 Kytami – violin
 Sara Fitzpatrick – violin

Discography 
 2008 – Delhi 2 Dublin
 2009 – Remixed
 2010 – Planet Electric
 2011 – Planet: Electrified
 2011 – Delhi 2 Dubland
 2012 – Turn Up The Stereo
 2014 – Turn Up The Stereo: Remixed
 2014 – Delhi 2 Dublin: LIVE
 2015 – We're All Desi (release date: Sept 18, 2015)
 2019 – We Got This

References

External links

 

Musical groups established in 2006
Musical groups from Vancouver
Canadian world music groups
Bhangra (music) musical groups
Celtic fusion groups
2006 establishments in British Columbia